Wanda Nowak (born 16 January 1913) was an Austrian athlete. She competed in the women's high jump at the 1936 Summer Olympics.

References

External links
 

1913 births
Year of death missing
Athletes (track and field) at the 1936 Summer Olympics
Austrian female high jumpers
Olympic athletes of Austria
Place of birth missing